The Gift of Fear: Survival Signals That Protect Us from Violence is a nonfiction self-help book (Dell Publishing 1997, republished with new epilogue 1998) written by Gavin de Becker. The book demonstrates how every individual should learn to trust the inherent "gift" of their gut instinct. By learning to recognize various warning signs and precursors to violence, it becomes possible to avoid potential trauma and harm.  

The Gift of Fear spent four months on The New York Times Bestseller List, was a #1 National Bestseller, and has been published in 14 languages. The book has been endorsed by a wide variety of celebrities including Marcia Clark, Carolyn Hax, Oprah Winfrey, Meryl Streep, Jodie Foster, David Mamet, and others who have referred to the book in interviews.

For more than a decade, it has regularly been the #1 bestselling book in the English language on Violence in Society, Abuse, and Safety. De Becker is also listed on Amazon's Top 100 Self Help authors. The Gift of Fear was selected for the book, 50 Psychology Classics.

Summary
By finding patterns in stories of violence and abuse, de Becker seeks to highlight the inherent predictability of violence. The book explores various settings where violence may be found—the workplace, the home, the school, dating—and describes what de Becker calls pre-incident indicators (PINS). By noticing PINS (events and behaviors that often precede violence), individuals can better predict violence before it occurs and, therefore, take the necessary precautions and actions to stay safe. The Gift of Fear also describes de Becker's MOSAIC Threat Assessment Systems, which have been employed by various celebrities and government agencies to predict and prevent violence.

PINS (Pre-Incident Indicators)
 Forced Teaming - This is when a person implies that they have something in common with their chosen victim, acting as if they have a shared predicament when that isn't really true. Speaking in "we" terms is a mark of this, i.e. "We don't need to talk outside... Let's go in."
 Charm and Niceness - This is being polite and friendly to a chosen victim in order to manipulate him or her by disarming their mistrust.
 Too many details - If a person is lying they will add excessive details to make themselves sound more credible to their chosen victim.
 Typecasting - An insult is used to get a chosen victim who would otherwise ignore one to engage in conversation to counteract the insult. For example: "Oh, I bet you're too stuck-up to talk to a guy like me." The tendency is for the chosen victim to want to prove the insult untrue.
 Loan Sharking - Giving unsolicited help to the chosen victim and anticipating they'll feel obliged to extend some reciprocal openness in return.
 The Unsolicited Promise - A promise to do (or not do) something when no such promise is asked for; this usually means that such a promise will be broken. For example: an unsolicited, "I promise I'll leave you alone after this," usually means the chosen victim will not be left alone. Similarly, an unsolicited "I promise I won't hurt you" usually means the person intends to hurt their chosen victim.
 Discounting the Word "No" - Refusing to accept rejection.

Reception
Described by The Boston Globe as a "how-to book that reads like a thriller", The Gift of Fear spent four months on The New York Times bestseller list and was a #1 US bestseller.

In 2008, Oprah Winfrey dedicated an hour-long show to commemorate the 10-year anniversary of the publication of the book. In the last year of her show, she dedicated two hour-long shows to de Becker's work in domestic violence.

References

External links
 First chapter of the book on NYTimes.com
 

Self-help books
1997 non-fiction books
Works about fear
Books about violence